Dhubri Assembly constituency is one of the 126 constituencies of the Assam Legislative Assembly. Dhubri forms a part of the Dhubri Lok Sabha constituency.

Dhubri Assembly constituency

Following are details on Dhubri Assembly constituency

Country: India.
 State: Assam.
 District: Dhubri district .
 Lok Sabha Constituency: Dhubri Lok Sabha/Parliamentary constituency.
 Assembly Categorisation: Rural constituency.
 Literacy Level: 59.36%.
 Eligible Electors as per 2021 General Elections: 1,95,920 Eligible Electors. Male Electors:1,00,592. Female Electors:95,325 .
 Geographic Co-Ordinates: 25°59'30.8"N 89°54'56.5"E.
 Total Area Covered:166 square kilometres.
 Area Includes: Dhubri municipality and Dhubri thana [excluding Gauripur Town Committee and the villages specified in item (7) of the Appendix] in Dhubri sub-division, of Dhubri district of Assam.
 Inter State Border :Dhubri.
 Number Of Polling Stations: Year 2011-177,Year 2016-192,Year 2021-23.

Members of Legislative Assembly 

Following is the list of past members representing Dhubri Assembly constituency in Assam Legislature.

Election results

2021

2016

2011

References

External links 
 

Assembly constituencies of Assam